Akhilandeshwari is one of the main forms of the Hindu Goddess Adi Parashakti. The famous abode of Akhilandeshwari is the Jambukeswarar Temple of Thiruvanaikovil. Other important forms of Adi Parashakti (Dandini/Parvati) are Meenakshi of Madurai, Kamakshi of Kanchipuram and Vishalakshi of Varanasi, padmakshi renuka of virumala  in  alibag konkan

The Devi’s name is split into three components. “Akhila” meaning the universe, “Anda” meaning cosmic egg, and “Ishwari” meaning the divine mother. Therefore, Goddess, the divine mother who protects the entire universe in her womb (cosmic egg), is known as “Akhilandeshwari”. 

Akhilandeshwari is the presiding deity in the Jambukeswarar Temple in Thiruvanaikovil along with her consort Jambukeswarar, who is an avatar of Shiva.

Legend
Once Parvati mocked Shiva's penance for betterment of the world. Shiva wanted to condemn her act and directed her to go to the Earth from Mount Kailash (Shiva's abode) to do penance. Parvati in the form of Akilandeswari as per Shiva's wish found the Jambu forest  to conduct her penance. She made a lingam out of water from the Kaveri river, (also called as Ponni River) under the Venn Naaval tree (the Venn Naaval tree on top of the saint Jambu) and commenced her worship. The lingam is known as Appu Lingam (Water Lingam). Shiva at last appeared in front of Akilandeswari and taught her Shiva Gnana. Akilandeswari took Upadesa (lessons) facing East from Shiva, who stood facing west. Just because of this till today during Uchi Kala Puja (Around 12 Noon), the priest of Akhilandeswari's temple dresses up like a woman, goes to the sanctum of Jambukeswara Shiva and offers prayers and performs puja to Shiva and Kamadhenu (Cow deity). It is believed that Akhilandeswari comes in the form of a priest to worship Shiva. Thiruvanaikovil is one of the temple where Akhilandeswari is worshipped as form of Adi Parashakti.

Another legend surrounds the Jambukeswarar Temple. Two attendants of Shiva, namely Malyavan and Pushpadanta always quarreled with each other over one thing or the other. During a quarrel, Malyavan cursed Pushpadanta to become an elephant and the latter cursed the former to become a spider in their next births. The elephant and the spider arrived at Thiruvanaikovil and found the Appu Lingam under the Venn Naaval tree in the Jambu forest. Thus, the animals started their worship of Shiva. The elephant collected water from the nearby Kaveri river and performed abhishekam (ablution) to the lingam. The spider constructed a web to prevent dust, dry leaves and direct sunlight from falling on the lingam. One day, The elephant saw the web over the lingam. It thought there was dust on the lingam and destroyed the web. It later collected water and performed abhishekam again. This went on every day. One day, the spider was angry over the overall destruction of its webs, crawled into the trunk of the elephant and bit the elephant to death. The spider died during the act. Moved by the deep devotion of the two, Shiva appeared and gave moksha (liberation) to the elephant and the spider, who were his attendants in their past life. 

There's also another story. After the creation of the heaven, earth and the sky, Brahma created a woman. Unfortunately, Brahma fell in love with the woman. Due to the lust on the woman, Brahma could not do his duty properly. The woman wanted to get away from the lust of Brahma and tried to move away, but a head of Brahma sprouted wherever she went. Brahma now had 5 heads. The woman went to Shiva and asked for help. Shiva agreed and went to Brahma. Shiva flung his trident and cut of the 5th head of Brahma, leaving only 4 heads. Brahma then repented for his actions and decided to do penance. Moved by his deep devotion, Shiva and Parvati appeared dressed as Parvati and Shiva respectively. When Brahma opened his eyes, he could recognize them and tell who was who. Brahma later asked for repentance and Shiva agreed as he and Parvati appeared again in their true form. Hence, till the present, the event is recreated in a procession where the procession deities of Shiva and Parvati are dressed vice versa and carried through all the five outer parts (prakaras) of the temple which is celebrated as Pancha-Prakara Vizha. 

There's also a story in which Shiva came in form of a saint called Vibhooti Seethar and built a wall, as per the wish of the King that ruled the place. It is believed that Rama worshipped Shiva here and hence, as a proof the lake of Rama (Rama Tirtham) is present here. It is also believed that Brahma and Indra worshipped Akhilandeswari here and composed stotrams, namely the, 
 Brahma Kruta Akhilandeswari Stotram
  Indra Kruta Akhilandeswari Stotram.

Worship
The idols (moola murtis) of Jambukeswarar (Shiva) and Akhilandeswari are installed opposite to each other – Such temples are known as Upadesa Sthalams. As Akhilandeswari was like a student and Jambukeswara was like a Guru (teacher) in this temple, there is no Thirukalyanam (marriage) conducted in this temple for Jambukeswarar and Akhilandeswari, unlike the other Shiva temples. The sanctum sanctorum (garbhagriha) of goddess Akhilandeswari and the sanctum sanctorum of Prasanna Ganapathi are in the shape of the pranava manthra, "Om". It is believed that Akhilandeswari was originally an angry deity (ugra devata) It was believed that Akhilandeswari was in the form of Varahi and devotees would pray to her only from the outside of the temple. Hence, during one of Adi Sankara's visits, he installed the Prasanna Ganapathi idol right opposite to her sanctum and installed a pair of Sri Chakra thaatankas (ear-rings) to reduce her anger. But yes apart from day time when she is Akhilandeswari and after Arthajama puja during night time she again becomes Varahi. No one dares to enter in once her sanctum is closed. Even many have witnessed the glimpse of Varahi during arthajama pooja. Some people even heard the roaring sound of Varahi at night. Apart from this she becomes Lakshmi in the morning, Durga at 12 Noon, Saraswati in the evening and as Varahi after the Arthajama puja at 9pm. Akhilandeswari is such a kind goddess who fulfils our wish if we seek her with true devotion and love. The Jambukeswarar Temple of Thiruvanaikovil is located near the Sri Ranganathaswami Temple of Srirangam, which is home to the deity Ranganatha. Hence during the Tamil month of Margazhi, it is believed that Ranganatha sends garlands, jewellery, sarees and gifts to his sister Akhilandeswari.

In Popular Culture

Muthuswamy Dikshitar, the 18th century composer of Carnatic Music, composed three songs in honour of Akhilandeshwari, specifically at the Jambukeshwarar Temple in Thiruvanaikovil.

In 2012, P. Unni Krishnan and Harini, the renowned vocalists rendered songs on Adi Parashakti through a devotional album titled Om Nava Sakthi Jaya Jaya Sakthi, in which Goddess Akilandeshwari was also praised through a dedicated song. This song contains depiction on the Jambukeshwarar Temple and its complete history captured in a most charming manner.

References

Hindu goddesses
Forms of Parvati